Gary Cummiskey (born 1963) is a South African poet and publisher.

He was born in England and moved to South Africa in 1983. He is the founder and editor of Dye Hard Press, which since 1994 has published writers such as Khulile Nxumalo, Gail Dendy, Arja Salafranca, Alan Finlay, Philip Zhuwao, Roy Blumenthal, Gus Ferguson, Kobus Moolman, Pravasan Pillay, Grame Feltham and Allan Kolski Horwitz. He edited Green Dragon literary journal from 2002 to 2009.

Cummiskey is co-editor with Eva Kowalska of Who was Sinclair Beiles? published by Dye Hard Press in 2009. A revised and expanded edition was published in 2014. Also in 2009, Cummiskey compiled Beauty Came Grovelling Forward, a selection of South African poetry and prose published online at www.bigbridge.org.

He was a participant in the 2008 Poetry Africa International Festival held in Durban, South Africa.

Through Dye Hard Press, Cummiskey published an anthology of South African short fiction, The Edge of Things, selected by Arja Salafranca, in 2011.

Cummiskey's work has been translated into French, Bangla and Greek. Three of his poems have inspired short films.

He published a book of short fiction, Off-ramp, in 2013. The collection was shortlisted for the Nadine Gordimer Short Story Award 2014.

From 2014 to 2016 he was editor of the South African poetry journal New Coin, which is published by the Institute for the Study of English in Africa, at Rhodes University, Grahamstown.

Bibliography
 Poetry
The Secret Hour, Dye Hard Press, Johannesburg,1994
Lost in a World, Dye Hard Press, Johannesburg, 1994
Visitations, Dye Hard Press, Johannesburg, 1995
River of Dreams, Dye Hard Press, Johannesburg, 1995
City, Sun Belly Press, Johannesburg, 1995
When Apollinaire Died, Firfield Press, Plumstead, 1996
Head (with Roy Blumenthal), Dye Hard Press, Johannesburg, 1998
Reigning Gloves, Dye Hard Press, Johannesburg, 2000
Bog Docks, Dye Hard Press, Johannesburg, 2005
Today is their Creator, Dye Hard Press, Johannesburg, 2008
Romancing the Dead, Tearoom Books, Durban, 2009
Sky Dreaming, Graffiti Kolkata, India, 2011
I Remain Indoors, Tearoom Books, Stockholm, 2013
Don't Stop Until Incinerated, Tearoom Books, Stockholm, 2016
 'In Naked Field', Concrete Poets Press, Leicester, England, 2019
Non-fiction
 Conspiracies of the Interior: a surrealist film scenario, Dye Hard Press, Johannesburg, 1995
Who was Sinclair Beiles?, with Eva Kowalska, Dye Hard Press, Johannesburg, 2009. Revised and expanded edition, 2014.
Fiction
April in the Moon-Sun, Dye Hard Press, Johannesburg, 2006
Off-ramp, Dye Hard Press, Johannesburg, 2013

References

External links
 Dye Hard press column on Kagablog
 Dye Hard Press blog
 Dye Hard Interviews blog

South African poets
1963 births
Living people
English-language South African poets